Jazz a Confronto 19 is a solo album by American jazz pianist Mal Waldron recorded in Rome, Italy, on April 1, 1972, and released on the Horo label as part of the "Jazz a Confronto" series.

Track listing
All compositions by Mal Waldron except as indicated
 "Tew Nune" — 4:36  
 "Picchy's Waltz" — 7:22 
 "Breakin' Through" — 6:50 
 "Canto Ritrovato" (Giorgio Gaslini) — 5:22 
 "Lullaby" — 4:19  
 "Appia Antica" — 9:13 
Recorded at Titania Studios in Rome, Italy on April 1, 1972

Personnel
 Mal Waldron – piano

References

1972 albums
Mal Waldron albums
Horo Records albums
Solo piano jazz albums